The Wildwater Canoeing World Championships are an international event in canoeing organized by the International Canoe Federation. The World Championships have taken place every two years from 1959 to 1995 and then from 1996 to 2001, from 2011 the event is annual.

Editions
In the odd edition 2011, 2013, 2015, 2017 and 2019 the championships included only the sprint events. The classic race differs from the sprint race by the length of the course, therefore by the duration, which can go from 6 to 25 minutes for the classic race and up to a maximum of 2 minutes for the sprint race.

Starting from the 2017 edition of Pau, the sprint championships took place together with the Canoe Slalom World Championships and given the remarkable success this was repeated for the second time at La Seu d'Urgell in 2019.

Events

Winners

This is the list of the winners of the main six events (C1 and C2 men and women, K1 men and women).

K1 classic
Since the 2002 edition also the K1 sprint competition has also been introduced.

Men individual
F1 until 1963, 1963 F1 and K1, from 1964 K1.

Women individual
F1 until 1963, 1963 F1 and K1, from 1964 K1.

K1 sprint

Men individual

Women individual

C1 classic

Men individual

Women individual

C1 sprint

Men individual

Women individual

C2 classic

Men individual

C2 sprint

Men individual

Multi-Medallists

Men individual 
 
Top male paddlers with the best medal record including only individual events are listed below.

See also
 Wildwater canoeing
 Wildwater Canoeing World Cup
 European Wildwater Championships
 International Canoe Federation
 ICF Canoe Sprint World Championships
 ICF Canoe Slalom World Championships
 ICF Canoe Marathon World Championships
 ICF Canoe Ocean Racing World Championships
 ICF Canoe Polo World Championships

Notes

References

External links
 

 
Recurring sporting events established in 1959
World championships in canoeing and kayaking